Antri Violari (born 27 September 1996) is a Cypriot footballer who plays as a forward and has appeared for the Cyprus women's national team.

Career
Violari has been capped for the Cyprus national team, appearing for the team during the UEFA Women's Euro 2021 qualifying cycle.

International goals

References

External links
 
 
 

1996 births
Living people
Women's association football forwards
Cypriot women's footballers
Cyprus women's international footballers
Apollon Ladies F.C. players